Hope Mills is a town in Cumberland County, North Carolina, United States. Its population was 15,176 at the 2010 census.

Geography
Hope Mills is located in western Cumberland County at  (34.970679, −78.956603), south of Fayetteville, the county seat. The town center is next to a dam on Little Rockfish Creek, forming Hope Mills Lake. Little Rockfish Creek flows southeast to Rockfish Creek, a tributary of the Cape Fear River.

North Carolina Highway 59 (Main Street) runs through the center of the town, leading north  to U.S. Route 401 in western Fayetteville, and south  to Interstate 95 at Exit 41. Several pieces of land around Exit 41 are within the town limits, although not connected to the town center.

History
Chartered in 1891, Hope Mills can trace its beginning back to 1766, when due to the wealth of natural water power and the abundance of timber, a lumber camp, saw mill, grist mill, and pottery business were established. In 1839, construction of the first cotton mill powered by the Hope Mills Dam was completed and was the beginning of a new era for the town. Much of the heritage and the town's name itself can be attributed to the cotton-milling industry that followed.

Before it was known as Hope Mills, the area was known as Little Rockfish Village and as Hope Mills Number One.

The local cotton mill and many other buildings were burned by General Sherman's troops during the Civil War.

The Big Rockfish Presbyterian Church and Hope Mills Historic District are listed on the National Register of Historic Places.

Today
While the town is small, it offers its residents a full variety of services and recreation. Public parks and recreational facilities are located throughout the town. These facilities provide walking trails to tennis courts. Hope Mills has its own police and fire departments and is only minutes away from four major hospitals. The new county library provides a number of special services, including summer reading programs and public meeting rooms. Five shopping centers, the historic downtown district, a post office, two medical clinics,  elementary schools (Baldwin, Rockfish, Collier, and Cashwell), middle schools (South View and Hope Mills), two high schools (South View and Gray's Creek) and more than 20 churches round out the community.

Demographics

2020 census

As of the 2020 United States census, there were 17,808 people, 5,759 households, and 3,834 families residing in the town.

2000 census

As of the census of 2000, 11,237 people, 4,112 households, and 3,108 families were living in the town. The population density was 1,844.6 people per square mile (712.4/km2). The 4,497 housing units averaged 738.2 per square mile (285.1/km2). The racial makeup of the town was 73.04% White, 17.61% African American, 2.03% Native American, 1.26% Asian, 0.21% Pacific Islander, 2.77% from other races, and 3.08% from two or more races. Hispanics or Latinos of any race were 6.40% of the population.

Of the 4,112 households, 46.4% had children under the age of 18 living with them, 54.0% were married couples living together, 17.4% had a female householder with no husband present, and 24.4% were not families. About 19.7% of all households were made up of individuals, and 5.3% had someone living alone who was 65 years of age or older. The average household size was 2.73, and the average family size was 3.13.

In the town, the age distribution was 32.1% under  18, 8.2% from 18 to 24, 37.0% from 25 to 44, 16.8% from 45 to 64, and 5.8% who were 65  or older. The median age was 31 years. For every 100 females, there were 90.4 males. For every 100 females age 18 and over, there were 85.9 males.

The median income for a household in the town was $40,697, and for a family was $44,866. Males had a median income of $34,120 versus $21,845 for females. The per capita income for the town was $16,534. About 5.7% of families and 7.8% of the population were below the poverty line, including 8.7% of those under age 18 and 13.7% of those age 65 or over.

Notable person
Cal Koonce, Major League Baseball pitcher

References

External links

 Town of Hope Mills official website
 Hope Mills Area Chamber of Commerce
 Cumberland County Schools

Towns in Cumberland County, North Carolina
Towns in North Carolina
Populated places established in 1766
Fayetteville, North Carolina metropolitan area
Logging communities in the United States